Bignall may refer to:

Bignall (surname)
Bignall End, a small village in North Staffordshire
Bignall Hill, Staffordshire
Bignall FC, a football club based in Rotherham

See also 
 Bagnall (disambiguation)
 Bignell (disambiguation)